The Philo T. Farnsworth Award (also called the Philo T. Farnsworth Corporate Achievement Award) is a non-competitive award presented by the Academy of Television Arts & Sciences (ATAS) as part of the Primetime Engineering Emmy Awards to "an agency, company or institution whose contributions over time have significantly impacted television technology and engineering". Named for Philo Farnsworth, the inventor of the first fully working all-electronic television system and receiver, the winner is selected by a jury of television engineers from ATAS's Engineering Emmy Awards Committee, who consider "all engineering developments which have proven their efficacy during the awards year and determines which, if any, merit recognition with an Engineering Emmy statuette". The accolade was first awarded in 2003 as a result of about a year of lobbying to ATAS by Farnsworth's wife Pam Farnsworth and Hawaii-based Skinner Entertainment management and production firm owner Georja Skinner.

At an annual award ceremony held in various locations, the ATAS presents the winner with a copper, gold, nickel and silver statuette of a winged woman holding an atom that was designed by engineer Louis McManus. It was first presented at the 55th Primetime Engineering Emmy Awards ceremony in September 2003. Motion picture equipment company Panavision was selected as the inaugural recipient for its work in developing "specialty camera items, cranes and dollies, Video assists, 35mm optics, cameras, lighting, trucks and grips". Since then, another 16 agencies, companies and institutions have received the award and none have won more than once. No award was given between 2005 and 2007 and in 2020. It has been presented to two separate recipients for different reasons in a calendar year once, in 2010, to the Desilu production company and the Digidesign audio technology firm. As of the 74th Primetime Engineering Emmy Awards, Arri is the most recent winner in this category "for its more than a century of designing and manufacturing camera and lighting systems as well as its development of systemic technological solutions and service networks for a worldwide complex of film, broadcast, and media industries".

Winners

Statistics

References

External links
 

 
Awards established in 2003